The 2014 World University Squash Championship is the edition of the 2014's World University Squash, which serves as the individual world squash championship for students. The event took place in Chennai in India from 1 September to 7 September.

Draw and results

Men's Single

Women's Single

Team Event

See also
World University Squash Championships
World Squash Federation

References

External links
WSF World University 2014 Website
WSF World University page

Squash tournaments in India
World University
World University Squash Championships
World University Squash Championships
Sports competitions in Chennai
2010s in Chennai
International sports competitions hosted by India
World University Squash Championships
Squash